Vivian Rushmore was an actress who had leading roles in several Broadway productions. She was cast in Charles Klein's 1914 production The Money Makers. She played a fairy godmother in the 1912 Cinderella themed production The Lady Slipper. She played a screenwriter in The Squab Farm (1918). She portrayed Bernice Warren in The Girl in the Limousine (play) (1919).

Munsey's Magazine ran a portrait of her in 1914. In 1921, Theatre Magazine included an image of her wearing a white chiffon outfit in character as part of a spread on fashion in opera.

Theater
Belle of Mayfair (1907), as debutante
The Lady Slipper (1912), as Fairy Godmother
The Money Makers (1914)
Fast and Grow Fat (1917), an adaptation of the story "Five Fridays", opposite Roy Atwell
The Squab Farm (1918). portraying a screenwriter
The Girl in the Limousine (1919), as Bernice Warren

References

Year of birth unknown
Year of death unknown
20th-century American actresses
American stage actresses